Tropidia flavipicta is a species of hoverfly in the family Syrphidae.

Distribution
Madagascar.

References

Eristalinae
Diptera of Africa
Taxa named by Jacques-Marie-Frangile Bigot
Insects described in 1859